Micromania-Zing, formerly Micromania is the major video game retail company in France founded in 1983 by Albert Loridan. From 2005 to 2014, it tripled in size under the leadership of Pierre Cuilleret.

In 2008, it was purchased by GameStop for approximately US$700 million (€480 million) in cash.

In 2017, the company merged with its sister company Zing Pop Culture and changed its name to Micromania-Zing. Zing, was launched in 2015 for distribution of derivative products of game franchises: manga, comics, films, etc. The consolidating merge addressed the decrease in gaming revenues.

References

GameStop
Video game retailers
Retail companies of France
Retail companies established in 1983
2008 mergers and acquisitions
Defunct video game companies of France